List of social fraternities and sororities at the University of Illinois at Urbana-Champaign currently consists of more than 59 fraternities and 36 sororities on the campus of the University of Illinois at Urbana–Champaign. Of the approximately 30,366 undergraduates, 3,463 are members of sororities and 3,674 are members of fraternities, which is 23.5%. The Greek system at the University of Illinois has a system of self-government. While there are staff advisors and directors in charge of managing certain aspects of the Greek community, most of the day-to-day operations of the Greek community are governed by the Interfraternity Council and Panhellenic Council. Many of the fraternity and sorority houses on campus are on the National Register of Historic Places.

List of social fraternities and sororities
List of social fraternities and sororities at the University of Illinois at Urbana–Champaign.

References

Fraternities and sororities
Illinois (UIUC)